Elizabeth 'Liz' Beddoe is a New Zealand social work academic,  and as of 2019 is a full professor at the University of Auckland.

Academic career

After completing a 2010 PhD titled  'Building professional capital: New Zealand social workers and continuing education'  at Deakin University, Beddoe rose to full professor at the University of Auckland.

Beddoe was a founding member of the Social Workers Registration Board.

Selected works 
 Davys, Allyson, and Liz Beddoe. Best practice in professional supervision: A guide for the helping professions. Jessica Kingsley Publishers, 2010.
 Beddoe, Liz. "Surveillance or reflection: Professional supervision in ‘the risk society’." British Journal of Social Work 40, no. 4 (2010): 1279-1296.
 McCann, Clare M., Elizabeth Beddoe, Katie McCormick, Peter Huggard, Sally Kedge, Carole Adamson, and Jayne Huggard. "Resilience in the health professions: A review of recent literature." International Journal of Wellbeing 3, no. 1 (2013).
 Beddoe, Liz. "External supervision in social work: Power, space, risk, and the search for safety." Australian Social Work 65, no. 2 (2012): 197–213.
 Adamson, Carole, Liz Beddoe, and Allyson Davys. "Building resilient practitioners: Definitions and practitioner understandings." British Journal of Social Work 44, no. 3 (2012): 522–541.

References

External links
 

Living people
New Zealand women academics
Academic staff of the University of Auckland
Year of birth missing (living people)
Deakin University alumni
New Zealand social workers
New Zealand women writers